Bombay is a locality in the Queanbeyan–Palerang Regional Council, New South Wales, Australia. It is located about 14 km southwest of Braidwood on the western bank of the Shoalhaven River. It has two areas of somewhat denser settlement described as "Bombay" (near Bombay creek) and "Little Bombay" (further north and near North Bombay creek). It had a school in 1871 (when it was called "Little Bombay Half-Time School") and from 1873 to 1928, normally described as "Bombay Half-Time School" but sometimes as "Bombay Provisional School".

References

Localities in New South Wales
Queanbeyan–Palerang Regional Council
Southern Tablelands